Grade II* listed buildings in Devon are listed buildings in the county of Devon, England, that are particularly important buildings of more than special interest. The county of Devon is divided into ten districts, namely Exeter, East Devon, Mid Devon, North Devon, Torridge, West Devon, South Hams, Teignbridge and the unitary authorities Plymouth and Torbay. As there are 1,237 Grade II* listed buildings in the county the list has been split into separate lists for each district.

 Grade II* listed buildings in East Devon
 Grade II* listed buildings in Exeter
 Grade II* listed buildings in Mid Devon
 Grade II* listed buildings in North Devon
 Grade II* listed buildings in Plymouth
 Grade II* listed buildings in South Hams
 Grade II* listed buildings in Teignbridge
 Grade II* listed buildings in Torbay
 Grade II* listed buildings in Torridge
 Grade II* listed buildings in West Devon

See also
 Grade I listed buildings in Devon